See Lists of video games for related lists.
This is a comprehensive index of commercial real-time tactics games for all platforms, sorted chronologically. Information regarding date of release, developer, publisher, platform and notability is provided when available. The table can be sorted by clicking on the small boxes next to the column headings.

Legend

List

References

Timelines of video games
 
Video game lists by genre